The Cozia National Park (national park category II IUCN) is situated in Romania, in the north-east part of Vâlcea County, in administrative territory of localities Brezoi, Călimănești, Racoviţa, Perișani, Sălătrucel and Berislăvești.

Location 
The National Park is located in the central-southern of the Southern Carpathians, in the south-eastern Lotru Mountains and the east of Căpățânii Mountains on the middle course of Olt River.

Description 
Cozia National Park with an area of 171 km2 was declared a natural protected area by the Law Number.5 of March 6, 2000 (published in Romanian Official Paper, No.152 on April 12, 2000) and represents a mountainous area with flora and fauna specific to the Southern Carpathians. Besides its peculiar aspect of flora elements, Cozia National Park has a good number of lichen species. Mustafa YAVUZ and Dr. Gülşah ÇOBANOĞLU from Turkey studied Lichen Flora of Cozia National Park in 2007
In 2017, two old-growth forests were inscribed in the Primeval Beech Forests of the Carpathians and Other Regions of Europe nature site.

References 

National parks of Romania
Geography of Vâlcea County
Protected areas established in 2000
Tourist attractions in Vâlcea County
Primeval Beech Forests in Europe
Central European mixed forests